Cholmondeley may refer to:

People
 Cholmondeley (surname)
 Alice Cholmondeley, a pseudonym used by Elizabeth von Arnim for her book Christine

Places
 Cholmondeley, Cheshire, England, a civil parish
 Cholmondeley Castle, a country house in the parish
 Cholmondeley Islet, Queensland, Australia
 Cholmondeley Sound, a bay in southeast Alaska, United States

Arts and entertainment
 The Cholmondeleys, an all-female modern dance group
 Cholmondeley Award, for poetry, given annually by the Society of Authors
 Lord Cholmondeley, a minor character in The Transformers

Other uses
 Marquess of Cholmondeley, a title in the Peerage of the United Kingdom, also Earl of Cholmondeley and Viscount Cholmondeley
 Cholmondeley cello, made by Antonio Stradivarius around 1698
 Cholmondeley Children's Centre, near Christchurch, New Zealand
 Cholmondeley Award, an annual award for poetry given by the Society of Authors in the United Kingdom
 A chimpanzee brought from Africa by Gerald Durrell
 Cholmondeley's, a coffee shop at Brandeis University

See also
 List of names in English with counterintuitive pronunciations
 Cholomondeley Goonewardene (1917–2006), Sri Lankan politician and cabinet minister
 Cholmley
 Cholmeley
 Chulmleigh (disambiguation)
 Chumley (disambiguation)